Castello is a Malaysian Malay-language action film, written and directed by Bade Hj. Azmi. The film, which had wide release on January 9, 2006 in ninety-one cinemas across Malaysia, including Singapore and Brunei, stars Rosyam Nor, Erra Fazira, Que Haidar, and Liyana Jasmay. The main character is played by Nor, and represents the actor's first foray into film production.

Production  
Director Bade Hj. Azmi wrote the film, working on its script for one-and-a-half years.  To produce the film,  Rosyam Nor initially received Finas funds of RM400,000 with the rest of funding from Julie's Biscuits.

Synopsis 
Castello brings a story about Solo, a teenager raised in the Golok River. Solo married a Thai girl named Chalita. At the time of Chalita's pregnancy, he started to act as a drug trafficker to make her family's life more luxurious. But he was arrested and he was jailed for twenty years. In prison, he is known as Castello. After leaving prison, Castello tried to trace his wife and son. But he was disappointed when he learnt that his daughter Phim had become a drug addict. Castello strives to save Phim who is unaware that he is her father. One day Castello took Phim's money while the girl was dealing with drugs. Because of his overload, beyond Castello's consciousness, Phim has met drug traffickers and told him about his financial problems.

The distributor gives Phim the drugs she needs. But at the time Phim was high, she was raped by the distributors' friends as her debt to the distributor. Castello 'goes crazy' as soon as it finds Phim's destruction. He was determined to take revenge. But while struggling to defend his dignified child's dignity, Chalita (Castello's wife) was killed by the distributors' friends. Of course, Castello became angry and he acted more crazy.

Cast 
 Rosyam Nor as Castello @ Solo
 Erra Fazira as Chalita
 Que Haidar as Sepet
 Liyana Jasmay as Phim
 Zain Hamid as Solo
 Nuremy Ramli as Chalita 
 Nasrizal Ngasri as Nik
 M. Rajoli as Ustaz Asri
 Zack Taipan as Thai Nom
 Bront Palarae as Chet
 Suhaimi Suandi as Azan
 Kamarool Haji Yusoff as Chief Smuggler
 Abdul Aziz as Adi
 Erma Fatima as Adi Mother's
 Bohari Rahmat as Adi Father's
 Prono as Drug Addict
 Ramona Zamzam as Club Waiter
 Fizz Fairuz as Kuncu Sepet

Reception

Sun Daily reports the film as a hit collecting RM2.8 million at the box office.

Awards and nominations

References

External links
 

Malaysian crime drama films
Malay-language films
2006 crime drama films
2006 films